Botanist is an American black metal band based in San Francisco. The band was founded by American musician Otrebor who formerly ran the online music magazine Maelstrom.

Musical characteristics and lyrics 
In a departure from traditional black metal instrumentation, Botanist uses distorted hammered dulcimers and no guitars (aside from bass). Otrebor states he does not digitally edit his drumming recordings, in which he is purposely "playing as close to the edge of my ability as I can," to "hear the warts in my playing."

Botanist "entity" 
According to Otrebor, "When Botanist music gets recorded, I channel an entity within me that's been named 'The Botanist', a character whose perspective dictates the content of the music and lyrics." The Botanist holds a "romantic worldview in which plants reclaim the earth after humanity has killed itself," and he is "trying his damnedest to bring about the end of humanity because humanity is destroying the natural world and the natural world must prevail."

Influences 
Black metal band Ulver piqued Otrebor's interest in "black metal that's grown out of the worship of the forest." Dictionary-reading inspired Otrebor's use of complicated plant and insect names in lyrics and song titles, which he calls "in a way ... a tribute" to the extreme metal band Carcass.

An interview on Botanist's website states, "influences can differ from album to album, but artists that seem to consistently shape or inspire Botanist are The Ruins of Beverast, Stars of the Lid (and side projects), Ulver, Immortal, Pagan's Mind, Antonio Vivaldi, J.S. Bach, Arvo Part, Edenbridge, Helloween, Angra, Martyr, Bolt Thrower (Whale era)."

Reception 
Botanist received spotlight coverage from NPR, wherein journalist Lars Gotrich praises the albums I: The Suicide Tree and II: A Rose from the Dead as "surprisingly dynamic and hypnotic. The hammered dulcimer rings out and cuts like a blast-beated piano pounding paradiddles in some kind of black-metal drumline. ... Botanist has created an alternate world where black-metal tropes — buzzing sound, croaked vocals, bleak aesthetics — exist, but are sonically limitless."

Band members 
Botanist has existed mainly as a one-man project, however various lineups have been assembled for touring and collaborative albums.

Otrebor – vocals, drums, hammered dulcimer
 Daturus (2017–present) – drums
 Tony Thomas (2019–present) – bass

Former members 
 D. Neal – hammered dulcimer (2013–2016)
 A. Lindo – vocals, harmonium (2013–2016)
 R. Chiang – hammered dulcimer (2013–2016)
Balan – bass (2013–2016)
Toorpand – bass (2017–2018)
Cynoxylon – vocals (2017–2019)
Davide Tiso – bass (2018–2019)

Discography 
 2011: I: The Suicide Tree
 2011: II: A Rose From the Dead
 2012: III: Doom in Bloom
 2013: IV: Mandragora
 2013: The Hanging Gardens of Hell (EP split with Palace of Worms)
 2014: VI: Flora
 2015: EP2: Hammer of Botany
 2016: EP3: Green Metal
 2017: Collective: The Shape Of He To Come
 2017: Collective: Setlist
 2019: Ecosystem
 2020: Photosynthesis

References

External links 
 
 Bandcamp page

American black metal musical groups
Musical groups established in 2009
Hammered dulcimer players
Tumult Records artists